The Devil's Violinist is a 2013 film based on the life story of the 19th-century Italian violinist and composer Niccolò Paganini. The film had its US premiere on 10 March 2014 at the Miami International Film Festival.

Plot 

Niccolo Paganini has become a celebrated violinist in his generation and the demand for his public performances is nearly without equal. Paganini approaches his art of violin playing with a special passion which defines both his artistic standards and his moral standards when it comes to questions of art. He considers his musical art to be sacrosanct and not to be influenced by the conventional requirements of living in the real world. The cost of his musical exceptionalism is quite high and Paganini often indulges himself in his private life with excessive drinking, gambling, an opium habit, and visiting brothels of ill repute. His mounting debts have become a burden on his everyday life.

When he is approached by a supporter wishing to finance his musical career, Paganini becomes attracted to the life which Urbani the promoter has come to offer him. He signs a contract to oblige him to perform as scheduled by Urbani which appears to temporarily ease his financial discomfort. Still, Paganini cannot control his lust for gambling and begins to challenge even Urbani's ability to finance him. At one gambling house, he empties his pockets from his losses and then even wagers his violin for the table stakes in a card game. The proprietor offers him the option of simply playing something on the violin for the patrons of the club in order to cover the stakes of the bet, but Paganini refuses out of his own 'ethics' of "not playing as anyone's slave". The bet stands and Paganini ends up losing his violin.

At a concert in London, Paganini is loaned a violin by the first violist in the orchestra where he is performing and starts one of his virtuoso performances. Shortly after the start, the King enters his box at the theatre and Paganini interrupts the sequence of his scheduled numbers to perform an improvised version of God Save the King, to tumultuous applause. Paganini is again a success and the first violinist makes a gift of his own violin to Paganini to celebrate Paganini's success. Meanwhile, Paganini begins to form a relationship with one of the proteges of his manager John Watson who is an accomplished soprano. Paganini composes a duet to perform with her which is very well received and appears to push the protege into the spotlight. When a romantic relationship springs up between Paganini and the protege, the very youthful appearance of the protege causes the police to take notice and Paganini is arrested for seducing a minor. Urbani rescues him again by presenting proof that the protege is not underage and Paganini is released.

To deal with the situation of Paganini being distracted by this protege, Urbani arranges a rendezvous between Paganini and the protege after one his performances, however, he invites a courtesan to visit Paganini's dark hotel bedroom before the protege arrives. Paganini assumes in the darkness that it is the protege come to visit him and does not realize that he is sharing his bed with a courtesan. When the protege learns of Paganini's philandering she is livid and the chances of a relationship with Paganini become permanently tainted. Urbani's plan to alienate her affections by hiring the courtesan has succeeded. Paganini then returns to fulfilling his contract with Urbani and performing at various venues throughout Europe.

Paganini's romance with his manager's protege ends and she leaves the country. Eventually she marries and starts a family abroad which Paganini only learns about in retrospect. As the years pass, Paganini becomes severely ill from his years of living a prodigal life of sexual license and opium addiction and he dies of related symptoms bringing his virtuosity and career in music to an end.

Cast 
David Garrett as Niccolò Paganini
Jared Harris as Urbani
Joely Richardson as Ethel Langham
Christian McKay as John Watson
Veronica Ferres as Elizabeth Wells
Helmut Berger as Lord Burghersh
Olivia d'Abo as Primrose Blackstone
Andrea Deck as Charlotte Watson

Production 
Filming took place in Germany, Austria, and Italy.

Music 
Violinist David Garrett performs many of Paganini's pieces throughout the film, including Caprice No. 24 in A minor and "Carnival of Venice".

The English version of "Io Ti Penso Amore" features lead vocals by Nicole Scherzinger. Andrea Deck provides vocals sung in Italian in the film.

Release 
The film premiered on 31 October 2013 in Germany, 27 February 2014 in Italy, and had its US premiere on 10 March 2014 at the Miami International Film Festival.

Reception
Simon Abrams writing on RogerEbert.com opens his review of the film by saying "While The Devil's Violinist, an arresting biopic about inspired/possessed violinist and composer Niccolo Paganini, ends on a sour note, it's also beautiful and thoughtful."

References

External links 
 

2013 films
English-language German films
2013 biographical drama films
2010s musical drama films
American biographical drama films
American musical drama films
Biographical films about musicians
British biographical drama films
British musical drama films
Films directed by Bernard Rose (director)
Films about classical music and musicians
Films about violins and violinists
Films set in the 19th century
Musical films based on actual events
Cultural depictions of Niccolò Paganini
Films with screenplays by Bernard Rose (director)
2013 drama films
Films about composers
2010s American films
2010s British films